Arthur Bradfield (5 January 1892 – 25 December 1978) was an English cricketer.  Bradfield was a right-handed batsman who fielded as a wicket-keeper.  He was born at Box, Wiltshire.

Bradfield made his first-class debut for Essex against the Combined Services in 1922.  He made four further first-class appearances for Essex in 1922, the last of which came against Northamptonshire.  In his five matches he scored just 7 runs at an average of 1.75, with a high score of 4 not out, while behind the stumps he took 2 catches and made 3 stumpings.

He died on 25 December 1978 at Mochdre, Denbighshire, Wales.

References

External links
Arthur Bradfield at ESPNcricinfo
Arthur Bradfield at CricketArchive

1892 births
1978 deaths
People from Wiltshire
English cricketers
Essex cricketers
Wicket-keepers